The Day After Tomorrow (1994) is a thriller novel by Allan Folsom which appeared in the number 3 spot in its first week on the New York Times bestseller list for fiction.  Despite this being the first novel by Folsom, the American publishing rights for it were sold for two million dollars.

Plot summary
Paul Osborn sees the man who has murdered his father years before while sitting in a cafe, in Paris, and assaults him. The murderer, Henri Kanarack, flees. Osborn hires a detective to find out who Kanarack was and his address. He then devises a plan, involving Suxamethonium chloride, and planning to torture him to discover why Kanarack murdered his father, before killing him and dumping his body in the Seine.
Detective McVey comes to Paris in order to meet some experts on the case of a couple of decapitations, where the bodies and heads were found deep-frozen.
A few days later Osborn tries to kill Kanarack, torturing him with Suxamethonium chloride, but when he's nearly dead a third person enters the scene. He shoots Kanarack and the last information Osborn could get from Kanarack was that he was murdering 
Osborn's father for hire of Erwin Scholl. Osborn tells McVey about Scholl.
Out of McVey's researches arises that Osborn's father invented a scalpel that can be used at degrees of absolute zero and that in the same year he was killed a few other inventors were killed, whose inventions were all about surgery at extremely high or low temperatures and all vanished.
Because of that McVey and his investigation team have a suspicion that Scholl and his people might belong to an organization that's working on surgery making it possible to combine deep-frozen body parts and to thaw it so the person is alive.

Time passes, and McVey finds out about Elton Lybarger and a ceremony that should be held in Berlin. During this, in the main hall of the building, Elton Lybarger is giving the speech. Suddenly all doors close and all people inside the main hall are gassed with cyanide gas. Right after the cyanide attack the building is set to fire and Osborn nearly perishes.
After Osborn followed Von Holden, the only remaining organization member, to Switzerland and is nearly killed McVey gives Osborn a VCR tape, on which Osborn finds a whole confession of Elton Lybarger's physician. He confesses having experienced the surgery on Lybarger, because they were searching for a person, whose attributes and fingerprints were as much as the same as Adolf Hitler's, and having helped the organization, who was trying to build a new Third Reich, to raise Lybarger's two “nephews”, the perfect Aryans, who were raised with him since they were young. According to Salettl one of them should be the new leader after having undergone an operation.
Osborn can't remember exactly what happened in Switzerland, but then the scene replays in his mind. He sees how Van holden falls into a crevasse and how he opens the package Von Holden had been carrying with him all the time, and it's the deep-frozen head of the Third Reich's Führer, Adolf Hitler.

References

1994 American novels
1994 science fiction novels
American science fiction novels
American thriller novels
Novels set during World War III